Lisa M. Meier is an American politician. She is a Republican representing District 32 in the North Dakota House of Representatives.

Political career 

Meier has been a member of the North Dakota House of Representatives since 2001.

As of June 2020, Meier sits on the following committees:
 Budget Section Interim Committee
 Health Care Interim Committee
 Human Services Interim Committee
 Appropriations Standing Committee
 Appropriations Standing Committee - Human Resources Division

References

Living people
Republican Party members of the North Dakota House of Representatives
21st-century American politicians
Women state legislators in North Dakota
Year of birth missing (living people)
People from Mandan, North Dakota
Bismarck State College alumni
21st-century American women politicians